The Conservatoire Pierre Cochereau à rayonnement régional de Nice (C.R.R. de Nice) is a state-run regional music and dance conservatoire which serves the French city of Nice (Alpes-Maritimes). It was founded by Adeline Ballet, a pianist, in 1916. It is named for its former director Pierre Cochereau, who served from 1962 to 1979.

In the musical field, the conservatory provides instruction on stringed instruments (violin, viola, cello, contrabass), woodwinds (flute, oboe, bassoon, saxophone, clarinet), brass (horn, trumpet, trombone, tuba) as well as polyphonic instruments (piano, accordion, guitar, harp, organ, percussion). Singing, writing and musical composition classes, as well as early music lessons are also provided. The ballet and contemporary sections within the dance programme of the conservatory; and the dramatic arts are approached by interpretation, vocal work and improvisation workshops.

The current director of the conservatoire is Thierry Muller, who has served since February 2016.

Alumni

 Maurice Jaubert (1900–1940) composer of film music
 Freda Betti (1924–1979) opera singer
 Claude Bolling, (1930–2020) French jazz pianist
 Christian Ferras (1933–1982), violinist
 Scott Ross (1951–1989), American harpsichordist
 Gilbert Bezzina, violinist and opera conductor
 Philippe Bianconi, pianist
 Carla Lazzari, French child singer
 Clairemarie Osta (born 1970)
 David Kadouch (born 1985), pianist and chamber musician
 Bruno Destrez (1959), bassist and luthier

References

External links
 Website 

Music schools in France
Buildings and structures in Nice
Education in Nice
Dance schools in France
Organizations based in Nice